Stepfather or stepdad refers to a non-biological father who has not opted to adopt his wife's child(ren).

Stepfather, The Stepfather or Stepdad may also refer to:

Film and television

 Stepfather (Beau Pere), 1981 French film
 The Stepfather (1987 film), the 1987 horror film
 Stepfather II, the 1989 sequel
 Stepfather III, the 1992 sequel, starring Robert Wightman and Priscilla Barnes
 The Stepfather (2009 film), the remake of the 1987 horror film
 The Stepfather (TV series), a British crime drama

Music
 Stepfather (album), by People Under the Stairs
 Stepdad (band), a synthpop band
 "Stepdad", a song by Eminem from the album Music to Be Murdered By

See also
 "Stepdad (Intro)", a song produced by Dr. Dre from the album Music to Be Murdered By
 The Stepmother (disambiguation)